Md. Abdul Wajed Chowdhury (died 31 July 1992) was a Bangladesh Awami League politician and a Jatiya Sangsad member representing the Rajbari-1 constituency.

Career 
Chowdhury was elected to parliament from Rajbari-1 as a Bangladesh Awami League candidate in 1991.

Death 
Chowdhury died on 31 July 1992.

References

External links 

 List of 5th Parliament Members -Jatiya Sangsad (In Bangla)

1992 deaths
People from Rajbari District
Awami League politicians
5th Jatiya Sangsad members
Year of birth missing